Domnica ( 378) was the wife of Roman emperor Valens. Valens, who ruled from 364 to 378, was emperor of the East and co-emperor with his brother Valentinian I.  After the death of her husband in 378 she ruled as de facto regent and defended Constantinople against the attacking Goths until his successor, Theodosius I arrived.

Family 

Dominica was the daughter of the powerful and unpopular praetorian prefect Petronius, who was hated for his greed and cruelty. Her father's unpopularity was so great that it led to the rebellion of Procopius, a rival of Valens, in 365.

According to the account of Ammianus Marcellinus:
"To the emperor's cruelty deadly incentive was given by his father-in‑law Petronius, who from the command of the Martensian legion had by a sudden jump been promoted to the rank of patrician. He was a man ugly in spirit and in appearance, who, burning with an immoderate longing to strip everyone without distinction, condemned guilty and innocent alike, after exquisite tortures, to fourfold indemnities, looking up debts going back to the time of the emperor Aurelian, grieving excessively if he was obliged to let any one escape unscathed." 

Petronius was probably a Pannonian. Her further ancestry is unknown. Various of her relatives held influentials positions. A possible relative is Domnicus, an officer of Valens mentioned in Oration II by Libanius. Procopius, prefect of Constantinople in 377, is mentioned by Zosimus as a relative of Valens by marriage. Suggesting he was also related to Dominica. According to Nicetas of Serra, Eusebius was her uncle and a praefectus urbi in the Diocese of Pontus. Nicetas was a commentator to the works of Gregory of Nazianzus and identified Eusebius with an otherwise unnamed figure mentioned in the works of Gregory. Eusebius is thus supposedly recorded in the funeral oration in honor of Basil of Caesarea.

The names Anastasia, Domnicus, Eusebius, Petronius and Procopius used by various family members are thought to be Greek in origin. Various scholars have suggested this could indicate the descent of Dominica and her relatives from Greek-speaking families of Sirmium, the initial capital of the Praetorian prefecture of Illyricum. Marriage into a Greek family could have helped solidify Valens' rule over the Hellenized Eastern Roman Empire.

Marriage 
She married Valens (c. 354) and bore two daughters, Anastasia and Carosa, before she bore a son and heir, Valentinianus Galates (366–370). According to Socrates of Constantinople and Sozomen both daughters were educated by Marcian, a former palatinus (paladin). Marcian had become a Novatianist presbyter. His continued service at court supposedly ensured that Valens held a more tolerant stance regarding Novatianists.

Religious scandals and the death of Galates 
The history of the Christian Church in the early 4th century was marked by the Trinitarian controversy. The First Council of Nicaea in 325 had established the Nicene Creed, which declared that the Father, Son, and Holy Spirit were all equal to each other and of the same substance. The theologian Arius, founder of Arianism, disagreed with this and believed that the three parts of the Trinity were materially separate from each other and that the Father created the Son. Dominica was already an Arian and is rumored to have persuaded her husband Valens to convert to the Arian sect. In about 367, according to Theodoret, Dominica convinced Valens to seek baptism from Eudoxius of Antioch, Archbishop of Constantinople. Eudoxius was one of the most influential Arians.

Valens was one of the few emperors of the century to favor the Arians. The empress is accused, with no proof, of having urged her husband to persecute the Trinitarian sect, including persecuting many prominent bishops. Persecution was common throughout his reign.

A group of pagan philosophers engaged in divination and predicted that a certain philosopher named Theodore would be the next emperor. When Valens discovered this prophecy he considered the philosophers guilty of a plot against his safety. Valens became enraged and killed the philosophers and, such was his fury, also killed other entirely innocent philosophers and even those dressed like philosophers.

The young Valentinianus's early death was a great blow to his parents, surrounded by religious scandal and quarrels.  According to Socrates, Dominica told her husband that she had been having visions that their son's illness was a punishment for ill treatment of the bishop Basil of Caesarea. Basil was a prominent orthodox leader who opposed the emperor's semi-Arian beliefs.  When asked to pray for the child, known as Galates, Basil is said to have responded by giving Valens’ commitment to orthodoxy  as the condition for the boy's survival.  Valens refused to comply and baptize Galates Catholic. He instead gave his son an Arian baptism.  Basil replied by saying that God's will would be done, and Galates died soon after.

Defeat at Adrianople and the death of Valens
Valens perished in battle against the Goths at the Battle of Adrianople on August 9, 378. The exact circumstances of his death are unknown. The Goths then continued to move east and attacked Constantinople. Because there was no emperor to lead the forces, the empress Dominica was forced to organize a counterattack. According to Socrates and Sozomen, Dominica paid soldiers’ wages out of the imperial treasury to any civilian volunteers who were willing to arm themselves against the invaders.

After the death of her husband she ruled as de facto regent and defended Constantinople against the attacking Goths until his successor, Theodosius I arrived. The date and circumstances of her death remain unknown.

References

Sources

 J. McCabe, The Empresses of Rome (1911).
"Women in power Year 1- 500" url accessed 10/01/07

Lewis, Naphtali, and Meyer Reinhold, eds. Roman Civilization: Volume II: the Empire. New York: Columbia UP, 1990. 594–597, 614–615.
Schaff, Philip. Theodoret, Jerome, Gennadius, and Rufinus: Historical Writings. Vol. 3. Edinburgh: T & T Clark, 1892. Christian Classics Ethereal Library. 17 May 2007 <http://www.ccel.org/ccel/schaff/npnf203.i.html>.

External links 
Page of "Failure of Empire" reporting on her ancestry and family
Entry of her uncle Eusebius in the Prosopography of the Later Roman Empire

330s births
4th-century Roman empresses
Arian Christians
Augustae
Valens
Valentinianic dynasty
Year of death unknown
4th-century women rulers